Liptena ilaro, the Ilaro liptena, is a butterfly in the family Lycaenidae. It is found in western Nigeria (the now destroyed Ilaro Forest). The habitat consists of dry forests.

References

Butterflies described in 1974
Liptena
Endemic fauna of Nigeria
Butterflies of Africa